Lake is an unincorporated community in Laurel County, Kentucky, United States.

References

Unincorporated communities in Laurel County, Kentucky
Unincorporated communities in Kentucky